The 15th Marine Expeditionary Unit (15th MEU) is one of seven such units currently in existence in the United States Marine Corps. The Marine Expeditionary Unit (MEU) is a Marine Air Ground Task Force (MAGTF) with a strength of about 2,200 personnel. The MEU consists of a command element, a reinforced infantry battalion, a composite helicopter squadron and a combat logistics battalion. The 15th MEU is currently based out of Marine Corps Base Camp Pendleton, California.

Mission
The mission of the MEU is to provide geographic combatant commanders with a forward-deployed, rapid-response force capable of conducting conventional amphibious and selected maritime operations at night or under adverse weather conditions from the sea, by surface and/or by air while under communications and electronics restrictions.

Current subordinate units
 Ground Combat Element: 1st Battalion, 4th Marines
 Aviation Combat Element: VMM-164 (REIN)
 Logistics Combat Element: Combat Logistics Battalion 15

History

Early years
In April 1983, the Commandant of the Marine Corps approved the original Marine Air-Ground Task Force (MAGTF) Headquarters concept, providing for the sourcing of two Marine Amphibious Unit (MAU) headquarters from each Marine Amphibious Brigade headquarters. The Commandant directed the establishment of two additional MAU headquarters in November 1985. As a result, the Headquarters, 15th Marine Amphibious Unit was activated 1 July 1987 at Camp Pendleton.

The Commandant directed the replacement of the title "Headquarters" with "Command Element" in the titles of the MAGTFs in August 1987. The 15th MAU's designation was further changed in February 1988 to the 15th Marine Expeditionary Unit. Both changes were made to more accurately reflect the operational and expeditionary nature of the MAGTF. Before World War II, and in the period between then and the Vietnam War, Marine units dispatched for overseas service were generally designated as "expeditionary brigades."

Since its activation in July 1987, the 15th MEU has trained to meet its mission in the rotation with the 11th and 13th MEUs to provide a continuous presence in the Western Pacific, Indian Ocean, and Persian Gulf and as a ready MAGTF in the continental United States.

In October 1989, the MEU assisted in relief efforts following the 1989 Loma Prieta earthquake, performing their assigned missions and also taking on several volunteer projects to help the victims of the disaster.

1990s
Marines of the 15th MEU relieved the 1st Battalion, 24th Marines (1/24, 4th Marine Division) to continue the evacuation of the Republic of the Philippines in August 1991 after the eruption of Mount Pinatubo that had occurred six weeks earlier. Assistance lasted over a month as the Marines distributed food and medical supplies, evacuated stranded villagers and provided security to other rescue personnel.

The MEU spearheaded Operation Restore Hope on 9 December 1992, to provide humanitarian assistance to the civil war torn and famine-stricken country of Somalia. After a predawn landing, the Marines secured the capital city of Mogadishu, the international airport and maritime shipping port facilities, as well as the American Embassy, and quickly moved into other inland areas to protect food distribution convoys and patrol the streets to restore order. The MEU pushed into and secured the inland cities of Baidoa and Balidogle and the coastal town of Kismayo in order to establish relief efforts and maintain security.

During its deployment in 1994, the MEU provided a detachment of CH-53Es to assist in the Rwanda Relief Effort. The detachment, based in Entebbe, Uganda, provided the only heavy lift capability to the joint task force commander. A few weeks later the MEU assisted in the relocation of the United States Liaison Office from Mogadishu, Somalia, to Nairobi, Kenya.

In October 1994, the MEU was called on again to provide a quick reaction force to counter any possible Iraqi aggression against Kuwait. Within 48 hours, the MEU sent Marines ashore in Kuwait City to demonstrate U.S. resolve in maintaining peace and security in the area.

In January 1996, July 1997, and October 1998, AV-8B Harriers from the 15th MEU (SOC) participated in Operation Southern Watch, patrolling the No-fly zone over southern Iraq maintaining continuous surveillance of the Kuwait-Iraq border, and to ensure the Iraqi military did not violate any United Nations resolutions passed since the Gulf War.

During its 2000 deployment, the 15th MEU (SOC) also participated in the Australian-led Operation Stabilise, providing desperately needed assistance to the people of East Timor, and again patrolled the skies over Southern Iraq in support of Operation Southern Watch.

Global War on Terrorism

Marines of the Forward Command Element of the 15th MEU (SOC) were in East Timor readying for the arrival of the ARG to conduct Humanitarian Operations, while the ARG was in Darwin, Australia during the September 2001 terror attacks on the United States. Following the 11 September attacks on the World Trade Center and the Pentagon, the 15th MEU (SOC) continued their plans of humanitarian operations to assist the war-torn country of East Timor, before sailing to the North Arabian Sea in support of Operation Enduring Freedom.

On 7 October 2001, the 15th MEU participated in the United States' new "War on Terrorism", sending Marines and Sailors into Northern Pakistan to establish a forward operating air base and logistical hub. These Marines provided security to USAF personnel who arrived on location shortly after the 15th MEU Marines of Battalion Landing Team 1/1 had established security.

On 25 November 2001, the Marines and Sailors of the 15th MEU (SOC) conducted an Amphibious assault over  into the land-locked country of Afghanistan. The Marines and Sailors set new standards for Marine Corps amphibious doctrine. The Marines and coalition forces later moved north to Kandahar International Airport securing a new forward operating base. With the move, the Marines and coalition forces were able to continue with new missions and build a prison camp that housed numerous Taliban and Al-Qaeda fighters.

On 6 January 2003, this time on board the  ARG, the 15th MEU (SOC) departed once again for another deployment. In mid-February, elements of the MEU off-loaded and established a training camp in Northern Kuwait while other members of the MAGTF – primarily the helicopter squadron – remained on board the Tarawa ARG in the Persian Gulf.

During February and March 2003, tactical control (TACON) of the MEU was assigned to the United Kingdom's 3 Commando Brigade Royal Marines for Operation Iraqi Freedom. On 21 March 2003, Marines from the 15th MEU crossed the border into Southern Iraq and secured the ports of Umm Qasr and Az Zubayr in order to destroy Iraqi resistance and enable follow-on humanitarian assistance to begin.

In late-March 2003, the MEU again became part of the I Marine Expeditionary Force and moved to An Nasiriyah, Iraq to relieve the Marines of Task Force Tarawa. In An Nasiriyah, the 15th MEU secured the remaining sectors of the city, conducted a supporting attack during the rescue of American prisoner of war Jessica Lynch and continued to establish security throughout the greater An Nasiriyah area. The MEU provided humanitarian assistance to the local population that included purifying drinking water, and doctors and corpsmen assisted medical care. The MEU began helping establish the local government to include police and other local services in addition to continuing to conduct airborne surveillance and direct-action raids on the ground to seek out and capture any Ba’ath Party or Fedayeen resistance.

In January 2005, the 15th MEU participated in Operation Unified Assistance by providing disaster relief to survivors of the destructive tsunami in Sumatra, Indonesia and southern Sri Lanka. Immediately after wrapping up those operations, the 15th MEU proceeded south of Baghdad, Iraq to Forward Operating Base Falcon near Al-Mahmudiyah, Babil province, south of for security and stability operations in between rotations of army units. Their deployment into Iraq lasted about 30 days.

On 13 September 2006, the 15th MEU was once again deployed to Iraq.

On 11 February 2007, the unit received notice of its second extension of their deployment in support of President Bush's surge of additional forces into the critical areas of Iraq. While operating in Al Anbar, the MEU conducted combat operations in Rutbah, Barwana, Haditha, Haqlaniyah, Ramadi and Al Asad in support of Multinational Force-West. The unit returned to San Diego on 30 May 2007.

On 2010, the unit was deployed to the Gulf of Aden for anti-piracy operations against pirates along the Somali coast. With 1st Battalion, 4th Marines as detachment, they were responsible for the 9 September recapturing of MV Magellan Star

The unit returned to Camp Pendleton 13 May 2013.

15th MEU Commanding Officers

See also

 Marine Air-Ground Task Force
 Marine expeditionary unit
 Organization of the United States Marine Corps

Citations

Bibliography

Web 

 15th MEU's Official website (Archived 2009-07-20). Link updated on 2009-06-30.
 
 
 
 
 

15